Jan Graham is an American lawyer from Utah who served as State Attorney General from 1993 to 2001.  Other than candidates for Lieutenant Governor running on a ticket with a male candidate, she is the only woman ever elected to statewide office in the state of Utah. She was the most recent Democrat to serve in a statewide elected position in Utah.

Early life, education, and legal career 
Jan Crump was raised in Salt Lake City, Utah.  She graduated from South High in 1967, and enrolled at Brigham Young University.  She transferred to the University of Utah, and then to Clark University in Massachusetts, and graduated in 1971 with a bachelor's degree in Psychology.

She returned to Salt Lake and enrolled in the University of Utah's graduate school, where she got a master's degree in Psychology in 1977.  While in grad school, she worked as a teacher at Franklin Elementary for one year, and as a counselor at the Northwest Multipurpose Center. In 1977, she enrolled in the University of Utah law school, and was awarded her J.D. in 1980.  While in law school, she married, and took the name Graham. She subsequently divorced.

She was hired at Jones, Waldo, Holbrook and McDonough in 1980.  By 1985, she had made partner, and become the first woman on the Board of Directors.  In 1989, she married Buzz Hunt.  She was a founding member of Women Lawyers of Utah, and one of the first four women members of the Alta Club.

Public office 

Joe Tesch, who was working for then-Attorney General Paul Van Dam, asked Jan to apply for the job of solicitor general in 1990.  She ran for the office of Attorney General in 1992, while she was pregnant with her first child.  She had her baby two days after the State Democratic Convention. In the general election, she defeated Iron County Attorney Scott Burns, getting 49% of the statewide vote. She was re-elected in 1996 in a rematch with Burns with 52% of the vote.

Jan Graham made the state of Utah a plaintiff in landmark tobacco legislation. The litigation included arguments over the Attorney General's power, both from the tobacco companies,  and from Utah's Governor, Michael Leavitt. The struggle between Utah's only Democratic statewide officeholder and the state's Republican legislature and Governor resulted in passage of a law requiring the Governor's okay on any civil litigation.  The Attorney General sued, a compromise was reached, and the law was ultimately repealed.

At the end of her second term, Jan Graham was one of two women on the Deseret News's list of Utah's most powerful people.  In addition to being the only woman ever elected on her own* to statewide office in Utah, she is also the most recent Democrat elected to statewide office in Utah.
(Deidre Henderson was elected to the office of Lieutenant Governor on a ticket headed by Spencer Cox. Olene Walker was elected to the office of Lieutenant Governor on a ticket headed by Mike Leavitt.  She succeeded him as Governor, but was not elected to that post.

See also
List of female state attorneys general in the United States

References 

Living people
S.J. Quinney College of Law alumni
Utah Attorneys General
American women lawyers
Lawyers from Salt Lake City
Utah Democrats
Women in Utah politics
Year of birth missing (living people)
20th-century American women politicians
20th-century American politicians
21st-century American women